Ixhuatlán del Sureste is a municipality of Veracruz, Mexico.

The municipality is delimited to the north by Coatzacoalcos, to the east and south by Moloacán, to the south-west by Minatitlán.

The weather tends to be warm year-round with rains in summer and autumn. The chief agricultural products are maize, beans, rice and oranges.

In August there is a celebration in honor of Saint Christopher, the town's patron saint.

References

External links 
 Municipal webpage 
 Governmental information 

Municipalities of Veracruz